Kieran James Shea is an author of science fiction who lives in the United States.

He has published short fiction in Ellery Queen's Mystery Magazine, Thuglit, Dogmatika and Crimefactory. Shea was twice nominated for the storySouth Million Writers Award.

His first novel, the 2014 sci-fi thriller Koko Takes a Holiday, was the first in a series about the ex-mercenary Koko Martstellar, and was followed by a sequel, Koko the Mighty, in 2015. Publishers Weekly review of Koko Takes a Holiday appreciated the "vigorous anarchic pulse" of Shea's narration, but considered that the story and setting, with its "many borrowed elements", held no surprises. The Library Journals mention of the sequel noted its "well-developed characters and nonstop action".

Works

Novels
Koko Martstellar series
 Koko Takes a Holiday, Titan Books (2014), 
 Koko the Mighty, Titan Books (2015), 
 Koko Uncaged, Titan Books (2018), 

others
 Off Rock, Titan Books (2017),

References

External links

Science fiction writers of unspecified nationality